Aziz Kalkamanuly (born 9 January 1993) is a Kazakhstani judoka.

He is the bronze medallist of the 2017 Judo Grand Prix Tbilisi in the -81 kg category.

References

External links
 

1993 births
Living people
Kazakhstani male judoka
Judoka at the 2014 Asian Games
Asian Games silver medalists for Kazakhstan
Asian Games medalists in judo
Medalists at the 2014 Asian Games
21st-century Kazakhstani people